The China Sevens, most recently hosted in Huizhou, is an international rugby sevens tournament contested by national teams. The inaugural event, held in Shanghai, was a leg of the IRB World Sevens Series in 2001. The tournament moved to Beijing for 2002.

From 2009 to 2012 the tournament returned to Shanghai as an official event within the Asian Sevens Series. The event was hosted at the Chaoyang Stadium in Beijing for 2014, then Qingdao in 2015 and Huizhou in 2019.

Results

International men's teams

Key:Light blue border on the left indicates a tournament included in the World Rugby Sevens Series.
Dark blue border on the left indicates a tournament included in the Asia Rugby Sevens Series.

See also
 Asian Sevens Series
 China Women's Sevens

Notes
 Huizhou was scheduled for 26-27 September as the third leg of the 2020 Asian Sevens Series, prior to August 2020 when Asia Rugby cancelled all their remaining competitions for the year due to the impact of the COVID-19 pandemic.

 Huizhou was scheduled for 25-26 September as the third leg of the 2021 Asian Sevens Series, but was subsequently replaced in the calendar by Dubai.

References

External links
 Shanghai Sevens

 
Former World Rugby Sevens Series tournaments
International rugby union competitions hosted by China
Rugby sevens competitions in Asia
Recurring sporting events established in 2001
Recurring sporting events disestablished in 2015
2001 establishments in China
2015 disestablishments in China